Sauerbach is a river of Baden-Württemberg, Germany. At its confluence with the Rombach west of Aalen, the Aal is formed.

See also
List of rivers of Baden-Württemberg

Rivers of Baden-Württemberg
Rivers of Germany